Rachel Sherwood (January 4, 1954 – July 5, 1979) was an American poet.

Rachel Sherwood was born in Washington, D.C., and grew up in Southern California.  She attended St. David's University College in Lampeter, Wales along with her dear friend and fellow Writer & Researcher, Kathryn Munyon Lemon. Rachel attended California State University, Northridge, where she co-founded the literary journal Angel’s Flight.  She also worked on the editorial staffs of 1822 and The Wallace Stevens Journal.  In 1978, her poem “Mysteries of Afternoon and Evening” won the Academy of American Poets contest at Northridge.

At the time of her death, Sherwood was enrolled as a graduate student at Northridge and was employed there as a teacher of English composition.  She had published poems in Angel’s Flight, Beyond Baroque, and Foreign Exchange, and had given several poetry readings in the Los Angeles area.  She died in an automobile accident on July 5, 1979, at the age of twenty-five.  To preserve Sherwood's memory, her friends established the Rachel Sherwood Poetry Prize at Cal State Northridge; the award is given annually to a student poet.  Poet David Trinidad also created Sherwood Press in her honor and published (in collaboration with Greg Boyd's Yarmouth Press) a book of Rachel Sherwood's poems, Mysteries of Afternoon and Evening, in 1981.

Reviewing Mysteries of Afternoon and Evening in the Los Angeles Times Book Review, Peter Clothier praised Sherwood's “attentive eye and sharp ear for language” and pointed out that, given the circumstance of her death, “the prescience of her vision is disquietingly accurate in several of these poems.”  One such poem, “The Usual,” concludes: “it’s the usual: spilt liquor, / broken dishes, wrecked cars.”  In his introduction to the book, Arthur Lane noted that Sherwood's “wit was mordant—properly so, given the time and place of her maturing, Los Angeles in the 1970’s.  Her appetite for life was fit for any Regency circle, though it was protected by an irony as vigilant as it was sharp-edged.”  Lane also wrote that “below the balancing act that these poems carry off so well wait serious nightmares: madness, horror, the systematic brutality of the late twentieth century.  Sherwood didn’t slip.  As a matter of record, she did so well that people didn’t even notice she was working without a net.  None of us knew how often she looked down.”

Published works
Mysteries of Afternoon and Evening (1981)

External links
Poetry Foundation blog tribute to Rachel Sherwood
Poetry Foundation author page

1954 births
1979 deaths
American women poets
Writers from Los Angeles
20th-century American women writers
20th-century American poets
Poets from California
Poets from Washington, D.C.
California State University, Northridge alumni
Road incident deaths in California